Bhagam Bhag is a 2006 Indian Hindi-language comedy thriller film written and directed by Priyadarshan from the screenplay by Neeraj Vora. It was produced by Sunil Shetty and Dhilin Mehta. The film stars Akshay Kumar, Govinda and Paresh Rawal as leads alongside Lara Dutta, Rajpal Yadav, Jackie Shroff, Arbaaz Khan, Shakti Kapoor, Manoj Joshi, Razak Khan, Sharat Saxena and Asrani. The film is a remake of 1995 Malayalam film Mannar Mathai Speaking which itself was based on the 1958 movie Vertigo.

The film tells the story of a theatre group which travels to London for a show only to be accused of a murder they did not commit, while mistakenly becoming the enemies of a drug dealer and a gang.

The film released theatrically on 22 December 2006, during Christmas, received mixed reviews from the critics but it was commercially successful and became 9th highest grossing film of the year.

Plot
Champak Chaturvedi runs a theatrical troupe in India. He hires two men, Bunty – a graduate in arts, and Babla - who cannot read nor write English. One has to play the role of the play's hero, while one the villain. Both men end up squabbling with each other, as both want the hero's part. Champak finds out that Bunty has molested the play's heroine, Anjali, and punishes him. 

The group gets a contract to stage 30 plays in Britain, however, on the day of the departure, Anjali opts out, leaving Champak no alternative but to travel without a heroine, but hoping to recruit one while in Britain. Upon arrival, Babla sets about to find a suitable heroine from the Indian population. In order to find one on the advice of Gullu, a cab driver, he goes to a garden where he has his suitcase accidentally switched by two men containing heroin, and as a result, both men, Bunty and Babla end up being considered suspects by the local Police, whose Commissioner is an Indian, J.D. Mehra.

The two men who switched the suitcase are revealed to be working under Manubhai Gandhi, a builder who is also a drug smuggler. Bunty, who wants to become the hero of the play, recruits a woman named Munni whom he first witnesses attempting suicide. Munni is accepted as the heroine of the play and through the course of time, both Munni and Bunty fall in love with each other. But Munni has an accident with a vehicle and ends up in a hospital. 

When she regains her senses, she tells everyone that she is Nisha Chauhan, and is married to Vikram, who lives in Liverpool. The doctor tells Bunty that Munni/Nisha has suicidal tendencies and thus had attempted suicide by jumping in front of the vehicle. Vikram arrives, thanks to everyone, and takes his wife home. A few days later, Bunty receives a phone call from a frantic Nisha, who tells him to come over immediately. He, along with Champak and Babla, arrive there to find her body in flames. She is declared dead in hospital. 

Now the troupe is on the hunt for another heroine for their play – when the unexplainable happens – as Bunty claims that he saw Nisha. No one believes him. They decide to enact the play in which there is no need of a heroine. On the play night, a frightened Champak also claims to have seen Nisha in the washroom of the theatre. But the more terrifying incident happens when a gun-holding Vikram bumps into Babla, Bunty and Champak and Bunty accidentally presses the trigger of the gun, killing him. They hide the body of Vikram and a blood stained kurta of Champak to avoid any suspicion. They go on to perform the play, but Vikram's body falls on the stage out of nowhere.

JD Mehra, who was present in the audience, investigates the case and find Champak's blood stained kurta and Babla's chain on the body of Vikram and has the trio arrested. When the trio is being taken in a police car, Gandhi's two men throw a bomb in the car out of revenge as they suspect the trio to be secret police, which compels them to escape.
Bunty suggests that they'll have to prove their innocence to get out of this trouble and for that, they need to find Nisha. They find out that Nisha has booked a ticket to Mumbai under the name of Aditi Desai. They call at the number she registered for booking and find out she has assumed the name of Sheetal and works at the bar. 

Bunty, Babla and Champak go to find the girl working at a bar and go looking for her in the bar, only to find another girl named Sheetal working there. They decide to follow her as they suspect her to be a friend of Nisha. During this time, Champak is kidnapped by Gandhi's men and they torture him to get the info, that they suspect he knows about their drug smuggling business. 

Babla and Bunty follow Sheetal to a train, where they witness her handing the ticket to Mumbai to Nisha and Bunty catches her and chases her to the top of a tower. Nisha reveals that her actual name is Aditi Desai, and she was hired by Vikram Chauhan to act as her real wife, Nisha Chauhan for some time in exchange of 20 lakh and a ticket to India. But, when her work was done and she had to go away, she witnessed Vikram killing her real wife to extort money from her. She tried to save Nisha, but failed to do so. It was the real Nisha who got burnt and died. 

On the play night, Aditi had come to tell the truth to Bunty and others, but she was seen by Vikram who was also there and wanted to kill Aditi (fake Nisha), who was the only witness in his wife's murder. But before he could kill her, JD Mehra, the police officer shot him. He was already wounded when he encountered Bunty, Babla and Champak. JD also reaches there, and tells his side of the story, that he killed Vikram to avenge his sister, Nisha's death. He tries to kill Aditi, as she was also the only witness in Vikram's murder, but before this happens, Gandhi's two men, Champak, Gullu and some goons reach there. 

All of them get stuck on the top floor of the tower and a fire brigade team tries to rescue them, but all of them get injured as they fall and land at different places.
All of them are admitted to the hospital. JD Mehra books a ticket for Champak's team and surrenders himself to the police.

Cast
Akshay Kumar as Bunty Rajkumar
Govinda as Babla
Lara Dutta as Aditi Desai
Paresh Rawal as Champak 'Champu' Chaturvedi / Champak Seth Ji
Arbaaz Khan as Vikram Chauhan
Sharat Saxena as Fredrick
Asrani as Ravinder Taneja
Manoj Joshi as Manubhai Gandhi
Rajpal Yadav as Gulab "Gullu" Singh Lakhan Singh Haryanewaale
Jackie Shroff as J.D. Mehra, London Police Officer. 
Shakti Kapoor as Guru
Razak Khan as Hakka
Amita Nangia as Vaijanti
Gurleen Chopra as Nisha Mehra Chauhan (special appearance)
Tanushree Dutta as Anjali Singh (cameo appearance)
Prerana Rathod as Sheetal

Production 
Shooting took place in Oxford, United Kingdom in July–August 2006, filming at several University of Oxford landmarks. The film borrows core plot from the Malayalam film Mannar Mathai Speaking with comedy sub plots from another Malayalam film Nadodikkattu. The plot twist in the climax was borrowed from the 1999 Marathi thriller Bindhaast which Priyadarshan had earlier remade in Tamil as Snegithiye and Malayalam as Raakilipattu. The climax comedy sequence was adapted from the 1963 classic It's a Mad, Mad, Mad, Mad World.

Reception 
The Times of India gave the film 3 out of 5 stars and stated, "The actors try hard, but the script and the dialogues let them down. Even the situations aren't funny enough, except for a few. Case in point, watch Paresh trying to chew a grenade and Govinda asking for a bite too. Funny!" Taran Adarsh of Bollywood Hungama gave the film 3 out of 5 stars and stated, "Bhagam Bhag will be loved for its comedy in the first hour, but the whodunit in the second hour tapers the impact." Gullu Singh of Rediff.com gave the film 2 out of 5 stars and stated, "The real hero of the film is Kumar. He outshines everyone and has some of the best dialogues in the film. He is a treat to watch." Indu Mirani of DNA India gave the film 0.5 out of 5 stars and stated, "Ever since Priyadarshan made Hera Pheri in 2000, he has been continually repeating the formula. When he doesn't do so, as with Kyon Ki (2005), he fails miserably."

Release
The film was worldwide released on 21 December 2006. The DVD of the movie was released by T-Series Home Entertainment. The film has been made streaming available on JioCinema , Zee5 , MX Player and Amazon Prime Video since 2020.

Soundtrack

Notes and references

External links 
 

2006 films
2000s Hindi-language films
Films shot in England
Films directed by Priyadarshan
Films featuring songs by Pritam
Indian comedy thriller films
Indian mystery thriller films
Indian slapstick comedy films
Hindi remakes of Malayalam films
Hindi films remade in other languages
2000s comedy thriller films
2000s mystery thriller films
2006 comedy films 
 Indian buddy films 
 2000s buddy films